"Lost and Found" is the second segment of the twenty-eighth episode of the second season (1986–87) of the television series The Twilight Zone. In this segment, two college students receive a visit from time travelers.

Plot
Jenny Templeton is a college student who discovers that her trash is empty after she filled it with her old notes. Her political science book is missing and then reappears. She accuses her roommate Kathy of playing a prank on her, and then realizes that her study books and high school yearbook are missing as well.

She hears a noise in her closet and thinks someone is inside. Kathy thinks Jenny is imagining things and opens the closet to reveal two weirdly-dressed people, out-of-sync and draped in light, who return her pencil mug. They tell her that they were not supposed to take anything that Jenny would have missed. The two are time travelers from 2139. They apologize to Jenny for disturbing her. They reveal that Jenny will become the first president of Earth and will be called "The Great Peacemaker." After they depart, Kathy stands in shock while Jenny thinks aloud that she will not cut her political science class anymore.

Production
This five-and-a-half-minute-long episode is based on the short story "Lost and Found" by Phyllis Eisenstein. The story was first published in Analog (October 1978).

The episode was slightly over eight minutes in its initial airing. However, the episode was cut down (most likely for international markets) to fit into the half-hour time slot. This was even before the show was cut for syndication, which reduced it to four minutes.

References

External links
 

The Twilight Zone (1985 TV series season 2) episodes
1986 American television episodes
Television episodes written by George R. R. Martin
Television episodes about time travel
Television episodes based on short fiction